In molecular biology, ST7 overlapping transcript 3 (non-protein coding), also known as ST7-OT3 is a long non-coding RNA. In humans, it is found on chromosome 7 in a locus spanning a translocation breakpoint associated with autism. It overlaps the ST7 gene, spanning intron 10 to exon 14 of ST7. Some isoforms of ST7 may use exons from ST7-OT3.

See also
 Long noncoding RNA

References

Non-coding RNA